The third election to the Carmarthenshire County Council was held in March 1895. It was preceded by the 1892 election and followed by the 1898 election.

Overview of the result

The Liberals retained a strong majority.

Candidates

37 members were returned unopposed; the vast majority of whom were Liberals. This meant that the Liberals were guaranteed a majority before a single vote was cast. 22 of those elected in 1889 sought re-election.

None of the retiring aldermen sought election as councillors.

Outcome

With only 14 contests out of a possible 51, the election attarcted relatively little interest. Much attention focused on Kidwelly where the sitting member Daniel Stephens was narrowly defaeted by the Conservative candidate. The Conservatives also won another three seats.

At Cenarth, the successful candidate was returned on the casting vote of the returning officer.

The subsequent election of Stephens as an alderman reflected some divisions in the Liberal ranks when a proposal was made that only elected members should ve elevated to the aldermanic bench.

Ward results

Abergwili

Bettws

Caio

Carmarthen Eastern Ward (Lower Division)

Carmarthen Eastern Ward (Upper Division)

Carmarthen Western Ward (Lower Division)

Carmarthen Western Ward (Upper Division)

Cenarth

Cilycwm

Conwil

Kidwelly

Laugharne

Llanarthney

Llanboidy

Llandebie

Llandilo Rural

Llandilo Urban

Llandovery

Llanedy

Llanegwad

Llanelly Division.1
Wilson had been elected as an Independent in 1892, defeating Gwilym Evans

Llanelly Division 2

Llanelly Division 3

Llanelly Division 4

Llanelly Division 5

Llanelly Division 6

Llanelly Division 7

Llanelly Division 8

Llanelly Rural, Berwick

Llanelly Rural, Hengoed

Llanelly Rural, Westfa and Glyn

Llanfihangel Aberbythick

Llanfihangel-ar-Arth

Llangadock

Llangeler

Llangendeirne

Llangennech

Llangunnor

Llanon

Llansawel

Llanstephan

Llanybyther

Mothvey

Pembrey North
Buckley, the prospective Unionist candidate for West Carmarthenshire, had been returned as an Independent Liberal in 1892.

Pembrey South

Marsh was returned as a Liberal in 1892

Quarter Bach

Rhydcymmerai

St Clears

St Ishmael

Trelech

Whitland

Election of Aldermen

An unsuccessful attempt was made to select aldermen from among sitting members only.

The following retiring aldermen were re-elected:

Joseph Joseph, Liberal (retiring alderman)
W.R. Edwards, Carmarthen, Liberal  
W.O. Brigstocke JP, Liberal (retiring alderman)
Dr J.A. Jones, Llanelly, Liberal (retiring alderman)
Henry Wilkins, Liberal

In addition, the following three new aldermen were elected:

John Bevan, Llansadwrn
Daniel Stephens, Liberal (defeated candidate at Kidwelly)
Thomas Watkins, Tycerrig, Llandovery, Conservative

The following retiring aldermen were not re-elected
John James, Llandovery 
David Randell MP, Liberal 
H. Nevill, Llanelli, Conservative 
T. Williams, Llwynhendy, Liberal 
D. Richards, Ammanford, Liberal

References

1895
1895 Welsh local elections